Cao Wenxuan (born January 1954) is a Chinese novelist, best known for his works of children's literature. Cao is the vice president of the Beijing Writers Association. He is also a professor and doctoral tutor at Peking University. His novels have been translated into English, Dutch, French, German, Italian, Japanese, Korean, and Serbian.

Biography
Cao was born in 1954 in Yancheng, Jiangsu. He entered into the Department of Chinese Language and Literature of Peking University in 1974 and started to publish novels in 1983.

Hans Christian Andersen Award 
In April 2016 Cao was announced as the winner of the Hans Christian Andersen Award for children's writing being the first Chinese author to ever receive the award. The International Board on Books for Young People's jury, announcing the award, said Cao "writes beautifully about the complex lives of children facing great challenges. He is a deeply committed writer, whose own difficult childhood has been deeply influential on his writing in which there are no easy answers." He received the award in Auckland, New Zealand, on 20 August 2016. His acceptance speech was titled  "Literature: Another Form of Housebuilding".

Cao's Dingding and Dangdang (2012) (Illustrated by Zhenjun Liu) series follows the life of two brothers with Down syndrome living in a small rural Chinese village. This series was selected as one of IBBY’s Outstanding Books for Young People with Disabilities 2015.

Works

Novels
 1985 The Old Walls
 1991 Goats Do Not Eat Heaven Grass
 1997 The Grass House
 1999 The Bird
 2000 The Red Tile Roof
 2005 Red Tile, Black Tile
 2005 The Thin Rice
 2005 Bronze and Sunflower
 2005 The Gourd Ladle
 2008 Dawang Tome: The Amber Tiles
 2008 Dawang Tome: The Red Lantern
 2012 Dingding and Dangdang (Illustrated by Zhenjun Liu)
 2014 A Cool Bird Wawa 
 2015 Firebrand 
 2016  Dragonfly Eyes
 2019  Caoxiewan Road

Novellas
 1983 A Cattle without Horns
 1988 A Small House Buried in The Snow
 1988 The Evening Has Come Down Upon The Ancestral Temple

Short stories
 1986 Mist Covered The Old Castle
 1986 The Dumb Cattle
 1989 The Blue Countryside
 1992 The Green Fence
 1994 A City under The Water
 1994 The Red Calabash
 1996 The Rose Valley
 1997 Sanjiaodi
 2005 The Windmill
 2008 Gouyayu
 2008 A Very Special Pigeon

Picture books for children
 Summer in a Cotton Padded Jacket 
 Feather, illustrated by Roger Mello English translation by Chloe Garcia Roberts
 Chrysanthemum Doll
 Last Leopard
 A Big Fish Swims East
 Crazy Rooster
 Bird Boat
 Flying Bird Nest
 Summer (translated by Yan Ding, illustrated by Yu Rong)
 Smoke (translated by Duncan Poupard, illustrated by Yu Rong)

Essays
 Crows

Awards and commendations
 Cao Wenxuan won the Hans Christian Andersen Award 2016.
 Goats Do Not Eat Heaven Grass – 3rd Song Qingling Literature Prize, National Five Top Project Award
 The Grass House – Bingxin Literature Prize, 4th National Book Award, National Five Top Project Award, 5th Song Qingling Literature Prize, 19th Golden Rooster Award for Best Writing (1999), Huabiao Award (1998), 14th Tehran International Film Festival - the Golden Butterfly Prize 
 Bronze and Sunflower – Bingxin Literature Prize, National Book Award, National Five Top Project Award. The English translation was a 2017 Kirkus Finalist, a New York Times Notable Children's Book of 2017, and has been nominated for YALSA's Best Fiction for Young Adults award, Center for the Study of Multicultural Children's Literature - Best Books of 2017. Helen Wang's English translation of Bronze and Sunflower earned her the 2017 Marsh Award for Children's Literature in Translation.)
 Dingding and Dangdang (Illustrated by Zhenjun Liu) – Selected as one of the 2015 IBBY Outstanding Books for Young People with Disabilities

Adaptations
One of his works has been adapted for film:

 The Grass House (directed by Xu Geng)

Two more of his works are being adapted for film: Bronze and Sunflower and Firebrand.

References

External links
 
 "Little Sugarcoating in Cao Wenxuan’s Children’s Books" by Amy Qin, New York Times, 1 May 2016
 "Bologna 2108: A Talk with Cao Wenxuan", by Teri Tan, Publishers Weekly, 5 April 2018

1954 births
Writers from Yancheng
Peking University alumni
Academic staff of Peking University
Living people
Chinese male short story writers
20th-century Chinese novelists
Chinese male novelists
Chinese children's writers
Chen Bochui Children's Literature Award winners
20th-century Chinese short story writers
20th-century Chinese male writers
People's Republic of China short story writers
Short story writers from Jiangsu